The 1991 Afro-Asian Cup of Nations was the fourth edition of the Afro-Asian Cup of Nations, it was contested by Algeria, winners of the 1990 African Cup of Nations, and Iran, winners of the 1990 Asian Games football tournament. Algeria won by the away goal after egality 2 - 2 in aggregates.

Qualified teams

Match details

First leg

Second leg

Winners
Algeria won by the away goal after 2–2 on aggregates.

References

External links
1991 Afro-Asian Cup of Nations - rsssf.com
1991 Afro-Asian Cup of Nations - goalzz.com

Afro-Asian Cup of Nations
Afro-Asian Cup of Nations
Mer
Mer
1991–92 in Algerian football
1991–92 in Iranian football
Algeria national football team matches
Iran national football team matches
September 1991 sports events in Asia
October 1991 sports events in Africa